Eyebrow restoration is a surgical procedure to reposition the eyebrow.  With advancing age, a common occurrence is descent of the eyebrow, or brow ptosis. A similar condition is eyelid ptosis. Eyebrow repositioning is a commonly performed procedure in cosmetic surgery.  The brow is repositioned, optimally, for the wishes of the patient as well as to correct the descent.

Surgical procedure
The procedure may be performed either open (through a standard or modified coronal incision) which allows for partial or complete ablation of corrugator supercilii musclesto avoid any need for them in the future but still allow for facial expression, or closed when an endoscopic approach is employed albeit with shorter long-term results.  In the very young, eyebrow position may be modified with injection of paralytics but only to a limited extent.  Lateral injection into a portion of the orbicularis muscle can elevate the lateral brow to some extent.  Generally, injection of paralytics into the forehead will cause a descent of the brow and thus brow position can be tailored by selective injection of paralytic agents, again, to a limited extent.  Significant change in position or posture of the brow generally requires a surgical procedure to accomplish the desired goals.

Another purpose of this procedure is to customize the appearance of the eyebrows.

It was originally intended for burn victims and patients of illnesses that prevent hair from growing in the eyebrow region. Eyebrow restoration surgeries - or transplants - have since evolved into a cosmetic procedure favored by people wishing to have perfect eyebrows.

Some traditional hair restoration surgeons offer eyebrow restorations as well. Both procedures should be only performed by certified surgeons who specialize in hair and eyebrow transplantation.

The most popular hair and eyebrow restoration surgery technique is follicular unit transplantation, which involves the removal of donor follicles from the back of the patient's head where hair tends to be more permanent. The most advanced form of follicular unit surgery is with the robotic system. Once removed, the "donor area" is then stitched back up with no visible scarring. The donor follicles are then transplanted into the "problem areas" of the patient’s scalp.

Eyebrow transplant
Eyebrow transplants are designed to restore growing hair to eyebrows that are overly thin, scarred, or completely missing. The absence of hair can be due to genetics, prior electrolysis or laser hair removal, over-plucking, thyroid or other hormonal abnormalities, or trauma due to surgery, burns or other types of accidents.

The donor hairs come from the scalp which, when transplanted into the eyebrows, continue to grow for a lifetime and therefore need to be trimmed typically once a month. To provide a natural appearance, the hairs are transplanted primarily one and occasionally two at a time, the natural way eyebrow hairs grow. This is a very delicate procedure, requiring perfect placement of these hairs into tiny half-millimeter incisions that are angled at just the right direction and positioned to mimic natural growth. The use of all-microscopically dissected grafts allows their placement into the smallest possible incisions so as to minimize scarring and damage to already existing hairs.

A procedure typically involves the placement of 50 to as many as 325 hairs into each eyebrow, depending upon the existing amount of hair and the desired size and density. Performed usually under a mild oral sedative, the two-hour procedure is essentially painless, as is the recovery period.

For the first two to four days after the procedure, tiny crusts form around each transplanted hair. By three to five days, other than some occasional mild pinkness which fades out by the first week, patients are able to return to normal activities without any sign of having had a procedure. Sutures that are placed in the donor area are removed at one week. The transplanted hairs fall out at around two weeks, then start to regrow at three months, and continue to grow for a lifetime.

References

Eyebrow
Plastic surgery
Hair transplantation